Tamara Zidanšek was the defending champion, but chose not to participate.

Priscilla Hon won the title, defeating Ellen Perez in an all-Australian final, 6–4, 4–6, 7–5.

Seeds

Draw

Finals

Top half

Bottom half

References
Main Draw

Bendigo Women's International - Singles